Dartmouth, also sometimes called Clifton, Dartmouth and Hardness, was a parliamentary borough in Devon which elected two Members of Parliament (MPs) to the House of Commons in 1298 and to the Commons of England, Great Britain, and the United Kingdom from 1351 until 1832, and then one member from 1832 until 1868, when the borough was disfranchised.

History 
Clifton, Dartmouth and Hardness were three towns clustered round the mouth of the River Dart in southern Devon; all three are within the modern town of Dartmouth. The borough as first represented in 1298 seems to have included only the town of Dartmouth, but at the next return of members in 1350–1351 it also included Clifton; Hardness is first mentioned in 1553, though may have been included earlier. The boundaries by the 19th century included the whole of Dartmouth St Petrox and St Saviour parishes, and part of Townstall parish.

Dartmouth by the end of the 18th century was a prosperous small port, depending mainly on fishing but also with some shipbuilding interests; but the bulk of the inhabitants had little voice in the choice of its Members of Parliament. After a decision by Parliament that followed a disputed election in 1689, the right to vote in Dartmouth rested with the corporation, which appointed its own successors, and with the freemen of the borough, who were made by the corporation. This amounted to a total of 71 voters in 1832, although only 53 of these were resident; virtually all were officers of the custom house or other government employees.

This franchise meant that once control was gained of the borough it was easy to retain indefinitely. Around the turn of the 18th century, the Herne family had almost total control, but in the mid-to-late 18th and early 19th century, control had passed to the government and Dartmouth was considered a safe seat for the party in power, returning one member at the nomination of the Treasury and one of the Admiralty. (Even this control had its limits however – Namier and Brooke quote letters to show that when a vacancy arose in 1757, the government had to abandon their original intention of nominating a soldier, and instead acceded to the corporation's demand for a naval candidate.) The Holdsworth family managed the government's interests in the borough, and generally had first refusal on one of the seats. Indeed, the Holdsworths were sufficiently influential to defy the government on occasion, as in 1780 when Arthur Holdsworth arranged the re-election of the popular but opposition-supporting naval hero Lord Howe to one seat while taking the other for himself – no government candidates stood against them, and both Howe and Holdsworth voted with the opposition in the new Parliament.

At the time of the Great Reform Act, the 1831 census showed that there were 611 houses in the borough but a population of 4,447. Dartmouth was allowed to keep one of its two MPs, and the boundaries were extended slightly to include the whole of Townstall parish and part of Stoke Fleming, bringing the population up to 4,662.

The constituency was abolished at the next boundary revision, which came into effect at the general election of 1868, after which the towns were part of the Southern Devon county division.

Members of Parliament

1351–1640

1640–1832

1832–1868

Election results

Elections in the 1830s

The 119 votes for Willoughby and Seale were declared void as they were placed by ineligible householders.

Elections in the 1840s

Seale's death caused a by-election.

Somes' death caused a by-election.

Elections in the 1850s

The election was declared void on petition due to bribery and corruption, causing a by-election.

Elections in the 1860s
Dunn's death caused a by-election.

Notes

References 
Robert Beatson, A Chronological Register of Both Houses of Parliament (London: Longman, Hurst, Res & Orme, 1807) 
 D. Brunton and D. H. Pennington, Members of the Long Parliament (London: George Allen & Unwin, 1954)
Cobbett's Parliamentary history of England, from the Norman Conquest in 1066 to the year 1803 (London: Thomas Hansard, 1808) 
 Maija Jansson (ed.), Proceedings in Parliament, 1614 (House of Commons) (Philadelphia: American Philosophical Society, 1988)
 T. H. B. Oldfield, The Representative History of Great Britain and Ireland (London: Baldwin, Cradock & Joy, 1816)
 J. Holladay Philbin, Parliamentary Representation 1832 – England and Wales (New Haven: Yale University Press, 1965)
 Robert Walcott, English Politics in the Early Eighteenth Century (Oxford: Oxford University Press, 1956)
 
 Frederic A. Youngs, Jr, Guide to the Local Administrative Units of England, Vol. I (London: Royal Historical Society, 1979)

Parliamentary constituencies in Devon (historic)
Constituencies of the Parliament of the United Kingdom established in 1351
Constituencies of the Parliament of the United Kingdom disestablished in 1868
Dartmouth, Devon